Craig Weller (born March 17, 1981) is a Canadian former professional ice hockey defenceman and right winger who played in the National Hockey League (NHL). Drafted 167th overall in the 2000 NHL Entry Draft, Weller played for the Phoenix Coyotes, Minnesota Wild, and Florida Panthers during his career.

Playing career
Weller was born in Calgary, Alberta. As a youth, he played in the 1995 Quebec International Pee-Wee Hockey Tournament with the Calgary Junior Flames minor ice hockey team.

Weller was the St. Louis Blues 5th round choice, 167th overall, in the 2000 NHL Draft. After playing with the Charlotte Checkers of the ECHL and the Hartford Wolfpack of the American Hockey League, he was signed as a free agent by the Phoenix Coyotes on July 19, 2007.

He scored his first career NHL goal on October 25, 2007, against the Anaheim Ducks; the goal turned out to be the game-winning goal.

On July 1, 2008, Weller signed a two-year, $1.2 million contract with the Minnesota Wild. On October 18, 2009, he was traded to the Boston Bruins along with prospect Alexander Fallstrom and a second round draft pick in 2011 in exchange for Chuck Kobasew.

On March 3, 2010, Weller was traded from the Bruins to the Florida Panthers along with Byron Bitz and a second round draft pick in exchange for Dennis Seidenberg and Matt Bartkowski.
 
On 1 November 2010, the Cardiff Devils of the EIHL in the UK announced they had signed Weller, who was a free agent at the time. He became the most experienced NHL player after Theoren Fleury to play in the Elite League, playing in his preferred position as a defenceman.

With Weller on board, the Devils embarked on 22-game unbeaten streak, breaking the league and world records. However, the Devils narrowly missed out on the league title, finishing level on points with the Sheffield Steelers but having won 1 regulation game less, before being beaten in the Playoff final 5–4 to the Nottingham Panthers. After his first season in the UK Weller quickly established himself as a reliable, solid two way defenceman, drawing admiration from across the league, culminating in 3 awards - League Player of the Season (Journalist's Choice), Player of the Season (Voted by League GM's and Coaches) and Defenceman of the Season (Voted by League GM's and Coaches).

Weller left the Devils to join Villacher SV of the Austrian Hockey League for a single season before venturing to Germany to accept a try-out with ERC Ingolstadt for the 2012–13 season. In establishing a position within Panther's lineup, Weller was signed for the remainder of the campaign on September 5, 2012.

Career statistics

Awards and honours

References

External links

1981 births
Living people
Canadian ice hockey right wingers
Cardiff Devils players
Charlotte Checkers (1993–2010) players
Chicago Wolves players
EC VSV players
ERC Ingolstadt players
Hartford Wolf Pack players
Houston Aeros (1994–2013) players
Ice hockey people from Calgary
Minnesota Wild players
Phoenix Coyotes players
Providence Bruins players
St. Louis Blues draft picks
Canadian expatriate ice hockey players in Wales
Canadian expatriate ice hockey players in Austria
Canadian expatriate ice hockey players in Germany
Canadian expatriate ice hockey players in the United States